Ekiti South-West is a Local Government Area of Ekiti State, Nigeria. Its headquarters are in the town of Ilawe Ekiti.
 
It has an area of 346 km and a population of 165,277 at the 2006 census.

The postal code of the area is 362.

References

Local Government Areas in Ekiti State